The 2020 United States presidential election in Arizona was held on Tuesday, November 3, 2020, as part of the 2020 United States presidential election, in which all 50 states and the District of Columbia participated. Arizona voters chose 11 electors to represent them in the Electoral College via a popular vote pitting incumbent Republican President Donald Trump of Florida and his running mate, incumbent Vice President Mike Pence of Indiana, against Democratic challenger and former Vice President Joe Biden of Delaware and his running mate, United States Senator Kamala Harris of California. The Libertarian nominees were also on the ballot.

Trump carried Arizona in 2016 by 3.5%, and it was considered a vital battleground in this election. The state's bitterly competitive nature was attributed to diversification of Maricopa County, a traditionally Republican stronghold that holds 61.6% of the state's population. Maricopa County was seen as vital to either candidate's chances in the state–only one presidential candidate has ever won the state without carrying it. The county is home to Phoenix (the state capital and largest city), Mesa, Chandler, Scottsdale, Glendale, Tempe, and several other major cities. High turnout among Hispanic/Latino and Native American voters was also seen as vital. Polls of the state throughout the campaign generally showed a Biden lead, albeit by a slender margin. Prior to election day, 11 of the 16 news organizations considered that Arizona was leaning towards Biden; the other five considered it a toss-up.

Biden ultimately won the state by some 10,000 votes over Trump, a 0.3% margin, marking the first time a Democratic presidential nominee carried Arizona since Bill Clinton in 1996, and only the second time since Harry S. Truman's 1948 victory. Arizona was the second-closest state in 2020, the only closer state being Georgia, marking the first time since 1948 that the Democratic nominee won both Sun Belt states in the same presidential election (though Clinton won each state in separate elections). This was also the first time since 1932 that a non-incumbent Democrat carried Arizona in a presidential election, or that an incumbent Republican lost the state. Arizona weighed in as 4.15 percentage points more Republican than the nation in 2020.

Per exit polls by the Associated Press, Biden won 59% of Latino voters, including 65% of Latinos of Mexican heritage, who made up the vast majority of the Hispanic electorate. Hispanic and Latino voters comprised 18% of the electorate, up from 15% in 2016 and 16% in 2008. He won 58% of independents and was even able to notch 9% of Republicans and 10% of conservatives. That support allowed Biden to narrowly flip Maricopa County, making him the first Democrat since Truman in 1948 to do so. He held his deficit among suburban voters to 51–48 despite Republicans having won them by double digits in 2016, 2012, and 2008. Biden won college-educated voters 53–46, a 17-point swing from 2016 when Trump won them by 10 percentage points. Additionally, Biden performed relatively well for a Democratic candidate among the state's Latter-day Saint voters, carrying 18% of their vote. Biden had touted his endorsement from Cindy McCain and leaned into his friendship with the late Senator John McCain in advertising. Trump disparaged McCain on several instances at rallies while campaigning and during his presidency, even after McCain's death, which some credited as the finishing blow to his performance among Arizona's moderate voter base.

After the election, the Republican-majority Arizona Senate launched a Maricopa County-based publicly-funded investigation into the election fraud alleged by Trump and his supporters. The controversial audit, completed in September 2021, found no evidence to support claims of significant election irregularities, and revealed Biden’s margin of victory in the state to be 360 votes larger than what the initial results indicated.

Primary elections

Canceled Republican primary

On September 9, 2019, the Arizona Republican Party became one of several state Republican parties to officially cancel their respective primaries and caucuses. Donald Trump's re-election campaign and GOP officials have cited the fact that Republicans canceled several state primaries when George H. W. Bush and George W. Bush sought a second term in 1992 and 2004, respectively; and Democrats scrapped some of their primaries when Bill Clinton and Barack Obama were seeking reelection in 1996 and 2012, respectively.

Of the 57 total delegates, 3 were allocated to each of the state's 9 congressional districts, 10 to at-large delegates, and another 3 to pledged party leaders and elected officials (PLEO delegates). 17 bonus delegates were also allocated.

The state party still formally conducted the higher meetings in their walking subcaucus-type delegate selection system. The legislative district and county conventions were held from February 8 to April 11 to select delegates to the Arizona State Republican Convention. At the Arizona State Republican Convention, which took place on May 9, the state party formally bound all 57 of its national pledged delegates to Trump. A May 15 email from the Arizona GOP stated that "every one of our ... delegates ... elected pledged to support Donald Trump and Mike Pence as the Republican Party's 2020 nominees for President and Vice President!"

The 54 pledged delegates Arizona sent to the national convention were joined by 3 pledged PLEO delegates, consisting of the National Committeeman, National Committeewoman, and chairman of the Arizona Republican Party.

Democratic primary

The Arizona Democratic primary took place on March 17, 2020, on the same date as the Democratic primaries in Florida and Illinois. Former Vice President Joe Biden won the primary with 43.7% of the vote and 38 delegates, running ahead of Senator Bernie Sanders from Vermont, who received 32.7% of the vote and 29 delegates. No other candidates received any delegates and the only other candidates to receive more than 1% of the vote were Senator Elizabeth Warren from Massachusetts, with 5.8%, and former South Bend, Indiana Mayor Pete Buttigieg, with 4.1%. Both Warren and Buttigieg withdrew prior to the contest. The other candidates on the ballot comprised a collective 1.2% of the vote.

Biden won 13 of 15 counties in the state of Arizona, with Sanders winning Coconino (home to Flagstaff) and Yuma (home to its eponymous city) counties.

The official vote totals reported by the Arizona Secretary of State added up to 86.7%, as the remaining 13.3% of the vote was composed of candidates whose individual vote totals were not reported.

†Candidate withdrew after early voting started.

General election

Campaign

Arizona was a heavily contested state throughout the election. Once a reliably Republican state, it has trended more Democratic in recent years, with Trump winning it by just 3.5% in 2016. Compared to past Republicans, Trump's performance was historically weak: Mitt Romney won it with a 9.0% margin in 2012 over Barack Obama, John McCain by 8.5% in 2008 also against Obama, and George W. Bush by 10.5% in 2004 against John Kerry. Arizona was one of just ten states to swing more Democratic in 2016, and its 5.5 percentage point swing was the fourth largest in the country. The swing mirrored a nationwide pattern where suburban voters, formerly the principal Republican voting base, swung deep into the Democratic column. Arizona's leftward swing was also credited to a rapidly growing Hispanic population.

The Democratic advantage in the state was pronounced further in the 2018 elections. Democrat Kyrsten Sinema won the open Senate seat against Trump loyalist and Representative Martha McSally by a margin of 55,900 votes (2.4%), flipping the state's Senate seat blue for the first time since 1988. Sinema carried Maricopa County, which holds the majority of Arizona citizens, by 60,256 votes. McSally would later be appointed to Arizona's other Senate seat on January 3, 2019 after the death of John McCain. Democrats also won a 5–4 majority in Arizona's House of Representatives delegation. In the legislative elections, Democrats maintained their deficit in both houses of the Arizona Legislature but picked up four seats in the Arizona House of Representatives and won the general ballot in the Arizona Senate. 

Both candidates spent massive amounts of money on advertising, though Biden outspent Trump 2–1.

Trump visited Arizona significantly more than his opponent, holding 4 rallies in just one week, compared to Biden, who only visited the state once. Biden favored small, masked gathering to limit the spread of COVID-19, which ravaged the state's large Navajo communities, whereas Trump favored large rallies with thousands of people in attendance, oftentimes without masks and contrary to the advice of health officials.

At his rallies, Trump campaigned with the Republican Governor of Arizona, Doug Ducey, as well as Republican Senator Martha McSally, in a bid to help her win reelection against Democrat Mark Kelly in the 2020 United States Senate special election. Ducey suffered from low approval ratings due to his handling of the ongoing COVID-19 pandemic – his approval fell from 50% to 29% before the pandemic to a 35–42 deficit in an October 2, 2020 poll. Ducey suffered opposition from both sides of the aisle: he was booed at a Trump rally in Tucson, with Trump supporters shouting "open up and open our state," while facing opposition from the left and public health experts for his failure to promote the usage of masks and other mitigation measures, downplaying the severity of the virus, and prioritization of reopening the economy.

Final predictions

Polling
Graphical summary

Aggregate polls

2020 polls

2019 polls

Donald Trump vs. Michael Bloomberg

Donald Trump vs. Pete Buttigieg

Donald Trump vs. Kamala Harris

Donald Trump vs. Amy Klobuchar

Donald Trump vs. Beto O'Rourke

Donald Trump vs. Bernie Sanders

Donald Trump vs. Elizabeth Warren

Donald Trump vs. Generic Democrat

Fundraising 
According to the Federal Election Commission, in 2019 and 2020, Joe Biden and his interest groups raised $9,284,978.20, Donald Trump and his interest groups raised $15,506,263.10, and Jo Jorgensen raised $29,078.65 from Arizona-based contributors.

Candidate ballot access 
 Joe Biden / Kamala Harris, Democratic
 Donald Trump / Mike Pence, Republican
 Jo Jorgensen / Jeremy "Spike" Cohen, Libertarian

Independent candidates who wished to run were required to submit a nomination petition and financial disclosure form between 120 and 90 days before the primary election. A valid nomination petition required signatures from 3% of unaffiliated registered voters in Arizona as of March 1, 2020. However, the signatories may be of any political party or unaffiliated as long as they have not already signed a petition for a candidate registered in a political party who intends to run in the same election. Petitions may be physical or electronic; in 2012, Arizona introduced E-Qual, an online nominating petition platform.

In-addition, write-in candidates were required to file a nomination paper (including the candidate's name and signature; residence and post office address; age and date of birth; and the length of time the candidate has lived in Arizona) and financial disclosure form by 5:00 p.m. on the 40th day before the election in which the candidate is running – in this case, September 24 – for their votes to be counted. Sore-loser laws prevent candidates who lost a primary election from running in the general election as a write-in candidate. Write-in candidates also may not run if they didn't receive enough signatures to attain ballot access while filing for the primary election or if the candidate did not receive enough signatures to gain ballot access in the general election. The following candidates were given write-in access:
 Howie Hawkins / Angela Nicole Walker, Green
 Jade Simmons / Claudeliah Roze, Independent
 Gloria La Riva / Sunil Freeman, Socialism and Liberation
 Daniel Clyde Cummings / Ryan Huber, Constitution
 President R. Boddie / Eric Stoneham, Independent

Electoral slates 
Technically the voters of Arizona cast their ballots for electors, or representatives to the Electoral College, rather than directly for president and vice president. Arizona is allocated 11 electors because it has 9 congressional districts and 2 senators. All candidates who appear on the ballot or qualify to receive write-in votes must submit a list of 11 electors who pledge to vote for their candidate and their running mate. Whoever wins the most votes in the state is awarded all 11 electoral votes. Their chosen electors then vote for president and vice president. Although electors are pledged to their candidate and running mate, they are not obligated to vote for them. An elector who votes for someone other than their candidate is known as a faithless elector. In the state of Arizona, a faithless elector's vote is voided and replaced, but the faithless elector is not penalized.

The electors of each state and the District of Columbia met on December 15, 2020, to cast their votes for president and vice president. All 11 pledged electors cast their votes for President-elect former Vice President Joe Biden and Senator Kamala Harris from California. The Electoral College itself never meets as one body. Instead, the electors from each state and the District of Columbia met in their respective capitols. The electoral vote was tabulated and certified by Congress in a joint session on January 6, 2021 per the Electoral Count Act.

These electors were nominated by each party in order to vote in the Electoral College should their candidate win the state:

Results

Results by county

Counties that flipped from Republican to Democratic 
Maricopa  (largest municipality: Phoenix)

By congressional district 
Biden won 5 out of 9 congressional districts in Arizona.

Exit polls

Edison 
The following are estimates from exit polls conducted by the Edison Research for the National Election Pool (encompassing ABC News, CBS News, CNN, and NBC News) interviewing 1,639 Arizona voters, adjusted to match the actual vote count.

Associated Press 
The following are estimates from exit polls conducted by the University of Chicago for the Associated Press interviewing 3,772 likely voters in Arizona, adjusted to match the actual vote count.

Analysis
Biden became the first Democrat to win Arizona since Bill Clinton in 1996, and only the second since Harry S. Truman in 1948. He is also the first Democrat to win Maricopa County since Truman, with a margin of 2.2%, or 45,109 votes. Arizona had been a Republican stronghold since 1952, even being the only non-Southern state to vote for favorite son Barry Goldwater in Lyndon B. Johnson's 1964 landslide. This dominance has been mostly attributable to Maricopa County, which is by far the largest county in Arizona; it has the state capital and largest city, Phoenix, as well as several other major cities including Glendale and Tempe, representing over 61.6% percent of Arizona's population. Though metropolitan centers have long remained Democratic, vast swaths of suburbs, which attracted old Republican voters from the rest of the country after the advent of air conditioning and retirement communities, have kept the state consistently in the Republican column after the New Deal. Any chance Biden had of carrying the state depended on doing reasonably well in Maricopa, which narrowly voted for Trump in 2016, the largest county won by Trump that year. Bill Clinton won Arizona mainly by holding his deficit in Maricopa to single digits, which made him the only candidate to ever win the state without carrying Maricopa. Ultimately, Biden's lead in Maricopa was over four times his statewide margin of 10,457 votes. Biden also became the first Democrat to break 47% of the vote statewide since Lyndon B. Johnson did so in 1964. Biden's statewide winning margin of 0.3% remained out of range for a recount, since Arizona Revised Statutes does not have provisions for candidate- or voter-requested recounts and an automatic recount will only be performed if the margin is lower than 0.1%.

The presidential results matched the congressional results, where Democrats held an identical 5–4 majority. Biden flipped the 1st district, which includes Casa Grande, Flagstaff, and Navajo Nation and voted for Donald Trump in 2016 by a 47.7–46.6% margin against Hillary Clinton. Trump easily won the 4th district, which takes in Prescott and most of the rural, northwestern portion of the state. He also carried the 5th, 6th, and 8th districts, all suburban, college-educated districts where Republican dominance has been slipping in recent years. The 6th district, for example, voted for Trump by a mere 4.1%, despite being a Republican stronghold represented by Republicans in the House for all but two years of its history.

Along with the 1st district, Biden carried the 7th and 9th districts, both of which encompass liberal bastions of inner Phoenix and parts of the cities of Glendale and Tempe, respectively. The 2nd and 3rd districts, both border districts dominated by Tucson and large Hispanic populations, also voted for Biden.

Arizona was seen as a potential Democratic flip throughout the year, as the state's increasing Hispanic population as well as an influx of retirees and younger college-educated voters were becoming increasingly friendly to the Democratic Party. Further signaling the state's blue shift were Arizona's midterm elections, where the Democrats flipped a U.S. Senate seat for the first time since 1988 and won three other statewide races as well as gaining a 5–4 majority in the state's House of Representatives delegation and nearly winning the state legislature. Dilution of the Republican's strength was also seen in local politics, most significantly in Maricopa County, in 2016, when Democrats won two county-wide races for County Recorder and Sheriff. In the latter race, former police sergeant Paul Penzone defeated Republican Sheriff Joe Arpaio, a controversial figure who utilized resources to perpetuate conspiracy theories about Barack Obama's birth certificate and engage in police misconduct, prison overcrowding, racial profiling, and a crackdown on undocumented immigrants. Trump pardoned Arpaio on August 25, 2017, after he failed to obey a court order in a case investigating his department's racial profiling to detain immigrants, drawing negative reactions from public figures and civil rights groups.

College-educated and moderate voters 
Exit polls from the Associated Press indicated that Biden carried college-educated white voters 50–48, which make up 28% of Arizona's electorate. He also carried college-educated voters overall by 53–48 and lost suburban voters by 51–48. Suburban backlash against Trump and the Republican Party was indicated as far back as 2016, when Arizona shifted 5.5 percentage points to the left even as 40 other states shifted to the right. Among other states that shifted to the left were California, Georgia, Kansas, Texas, and Virginia, all of which states where the primary Republican voting base laid in the vast suburbs and exurbs outside of major cities. Past Republicans had done very well in the white, heavily educated Phoenix suburbs: Mitt Romney won college-educated voters in Arizona 58–40 in 2012, John McCain by 55–43 in 2008, and George W. Bush by 54–46 in 2004. They also carried suburban voters by roughly twenty points. Perhaps the greatest sign of the suburban revolt was in Arizona's 6th congressional district – the most educated district in Arizona. It has been represented by Republicans for all but two years of its existence, and Bush, Romney, and McCain all won upwards of 60% of the vote in their respective elections. This time around, Trump won it by only four points.

John McCain and moderate Republicans 
Romney, McCain, and Bush were all seen as much more moderate than the Trump wing of the party – several of their former staffers outright endorsed Biden, stating "Given the incumbent president’s lack of competent leadership, his efforts to aggravate rather than bridge divisions among Americans, and his failure to uphold American values, we believe the election of former Vice President Biden is clearly in the national interest." Trump frequently disparaged moderate Republicans, reinvigorating the term RINO ("Republican in name only") to refer to members of the Republican Party who refused to support Trump's efforts to challenge the election results or even Trump's campaign at all. Trump and his family had criticized the moderate wing of the party on several occasions, which was seen as a divide that could prove mortal for the Republican Party in Arizona. On February 29, 2020, Trump called Romney a "low life" for voting to convict Trump of abuse of power in his 2020 impeachment trial, making the Senator the first in history to vote to convict a president of his own party. Romney would later vote to convict him again in 2021 for incitement of insurrection in response to the 2021 United States Capitol attack.

Perhaps the most fatal blow to the Trump campaign was his unabashed criticism of the late Senator McCain, who represented Arizona from 1987 to 2018. Several sources told The Atlantic that Trump told his aides that McCain was "a fucking loser" in response to McCain receiving half-staff flag honors following his death of brain cancer in 2018. Trump took credit for the Veterans Choice Act on several occasions despite it being championed by McCain and passed in 2014. He previously disparaged McCain on other occasions, stating "I don't like losers" in reference to him losing the 2008 election, "I like people that weren't captured" in reference to his being a prisoner of war in the Vietnam War, and criticizing him on his deciding vote against the American Health Care Act of 2017, a "skinny repeal" of Obamacare. These incidents culminated in Cindy McCain, John McCain's widow, endorsing Biden on September 22, 2020, tweeting that "There's only one candidate in this race who stands up for our values" in reference to the vice president. Democratic advertising often referenced Biden's longtime friendship with McCain in order to appeal to moderate voters.

Most analysts referenced Trump's attack on the moderate wing of the Republican Party (especially McCain) as an extreme disadvantage in the state of Arizona which had already been growing more unfavorable for Republicans. An article from Politico argued that the Trump campaign "did more damage to the Republican Party in Arizona than almost anywhere else".

Hispanic and Latino voters 
Pushing Biden over the edge was the Latino vote, who made up 19% of the electorate, higher than in previous years. Though Democrats have historically won ethnic and racial minorities by large margins, the Arizona Republican Party has had an especially strained relationship with the Latino community going back to 2010 in the wake of the controversial Arizona SB 1070 law, which was seen as, by some, unfairly targeting the Latino community. Historically, Democrats' biggest margins have been in heavily minority counties including two on the southern border, Pima, the second most populous county and home to Tucson, as well as Santa Cruz. A 2020 survey from the Pew Research Center found that the most important issue among Hispanic voters was to "establish [a] way for most immigrants in the U.S. illegally to stay legally," with 54% responding that it was very important and 29% that it was somewhat important. 42% also responded that "improv[ing] security of country's borders" was also a very important issue, and 34% that it was somewhat important. During the campaign, Biden campaigned on ending construction of Trump's Mexican border wall, dramatically increase the refugee cap from Trump's historically low 15,000 cap, and rolling out an easier pathway to citizenship for undocumented and prospective immigrants, including a proposed bill introduced after his inauguration that would unveil up a pathway to citizenship for all 11 million estimated undocumented immigrants. Meanwhile, Trump enacted several immigration restrictions on asylum seekers, refugees, and prospective legal and illegal immigrants, and some pundits credited Trump's victory in 2016 to immigration fearmongering.

While Biden did carry the Hispanic/Latino vote by a 59–40 margin, this was eleven points weaker than Hillary Clinton's 61–31 win in 2016 among Latinos, in spite of her loss statewide. Santa Cruz County, where 83.5% of the population is Hispanic or Latino, swung 12 points more Republican than in 2016, while Yuma County (63.8% Hispanic or Latino) swung 5.1 points more Republican. Nonetheless, these swings were cancelled out by a massive increase in turnout and a significant increase in the number of Hispanic voters.

Native American voters 
An increase in indigenous voting was also considered vital to Biden's victory – turnout in the northeast of the state surged compared to 2016. Biden easily won Apache County, dominated by the Navajo and Fort Apache reservations; and Coconino County, encompassing the Havasupai Nation and parts of the Navajo, Hopi, and Hualapai nations. The Navajo is the largest Native American reservation in the country. Anywhere from 60 to 90% of the Navajo Nation's 67,000 registered voters voted for Biden. In Pima County, Biden won the precincts encompassing the Tohono O'odham, San Xavier, and Pascua Yaqui reservations, often with over 90% of the vote.

On the congressional district level, Biden flipped Arizona's 1st congressional district, which Trump won in 2016 by a margin of 3,054 votes, or a 1.1% margin. The district encompasses Casa Grande, Flagstaff, and vast swaths of Native American reservations, most crucially the Navajo Nation, while conservative support has been anchored in whiter rural and exurban regions. AZ-01 has historically supported Republicans in presidential elections (albeit by narrow margins), a trend bucked by Biden who won the district 50.1–48.4%.

Concurrent elections 
The presidential election was held concurrently with elections to the House of Representatives and Senate. In the 2020 United States Senate special election, incumbent Republican Martha McSally, who lost the 2018 Senate election but was appointed to the Senate to replace Jon Kyl (who in turn replaced the late John McCain), ran for re-election, but was defeated by Democrat and former astronaut Mark Kelly. Kelly was widely expected in polling and forecasts to outperform Biden due to McSally's unpopularity, and ended up doing so by 2.05 percentage points. It also corresponded with 2020 Arizona Proposition 207, a referendum to approve the legalization and taxation of recreational marijuana, which was approved by over 60% of voters. However, House Democrats underperformed Biden, and Republicans won 50.1% of votes on the general ballot to the Democrats' 49.9%, possibly due to the lack of third-party candidates in all 9 races.

Aftermath 

By November 7, hand count audits had been completed in Cochrise, Coconino, Grenlee, Maricopa, Mohave, Navajo, Pima, Pinal, Santa Cruz, and Yavapai counties in order to test the accuracy of the voting tabulation equipment. Each of these county hand count audits either found there to be no discrepancies, or found their count to be within the acceptable margins of error identified by state election law.

While Maricopa County's November 4 hand count audit had found no discrepancies, an additional physical hand recount of 47,000 ballots (2% of election-day ballots plus 5,000 early voting ballots) was conducted in Maricopa County from November 7 through November 9, 2020, which again found no discrepancies.

On November 24, 2020, Governor Doug Ducey acknowledged that Biden won the state.

On January 24, 2021, the Arizona GOP voted to censure Cindy McCain, Jeff Flake, and Doug Ducey, all of whom vehemently denied conspiracy theories from the Trump campaign arguing that the results in Arizona were fraudulent and invalid. Between January 6 and January 20, the Arizona Secretary of State office reported that over 8,000 Republicans changed their party registration to Democrat, Libertarian, or unaffiliated, which was attributed to said actions by Trump and the Arizona GOP.

On February 23, 2021, Maricopa County announced that forensic audits of their vote tabulation equipment by two independent auditors had found no irregularities.

Controversies

Early call
Fox News called Arizona for Biden at 11:20 p.m. EST on November 3, election day, with 73% of projected vote counted. The Associated Press did so at 2:51 a.m. EST on November 4. Fox News received push-back from the Trump campaign as no other network called Arizona on election night. Fox News decision desk director Arnon Mishkin defended the Arizona call at 12:30 a.m., saying that Fox News was "four standard deviations from being wrong" and that Trump was "not going to be able to take over and win enough votes to eliminate that seven-point lead that [Biden] has". Biden and other Democratic candidates began election night with a wide lead in the state, and at the time Fox News called Arizona for Biden, he led by 210,259 votes (53.9% to 44.9%). The reporting in Arizona was the reverse of a 'red mirage' and 'blue shift' effect seen nationwide, where the counting of election day votes before early and absentee votes gave Republicans across the country an early lead. Votes cast on election day typically leaned heavily Republican while those cast early and absentee ballots leaned heavily Democratic, partially due to the skepticism of mail in voting mostly from Trump and fellow Republicans. However, Arizona and several other Sun Belt states had the opposite effect. Early votes and absentee votes cast before the election were pre-counted and released shortly after 10:00 p.m. EST, when polls closed. Election day votes, as well as a few absentee votes, were released on election night and trickled in throughout the rest of the week. FiveThirtyEight correctly predicted that close races "might have to wait for those last few ballots before knowing who won". Despite Biden's lead dropping throughout the week, it became clear that Trump's margin among election day votes would not be enough to overtake Biden's lead: Trump needed 59% of the outstanding vote to win, but continuously won around only 53% of the votes released in several ballot dumps after election day.

On November 11, Decision Desk HQ, along with several other outlets, projected that Biden would carry the state. On November 12, ABC News, NBC News, CNN and The New York Times all projected Biden to carry the state shortly after 11:00 p.m. Eastern.

Objection 
On January 6, as a joint session of Congress began to certify the election for President-elect Joe Biden and Vice President-elect Kamala Harris, there was an objection to Arizona's 11 electoral votes, brought forward by Representative Paul Gosar of Arizona's 4th congressional district and Senator Ted Cruz of Texas, and signed by 67 other senators and representatives. Debates began over the objection in the U.S. Senate and House of Representatives, but were abruptly cut short after threats by pro-Trump demonstrators that escalated into a full blown storming of the Capitol, forcing the building to be locked down and Congress to be evacuated. After the Capitol was secured at 5:40 p.m. and Congress reconvened, the objection failed 6–93 in the Senate, and 121–303 in the House. The riot reportedly dissuaded several Republican senators and representatives from objecting to the Electoral College results.

Lawsuits 
Following the election, Donald Trump, the Arizona Republican Party, Republican National Committee, and several others filed lawsuits attempting to overturn the results of the election in Arizona, citing unsubstantiated claims of voter fraud.

Overvotes lawsuit 
On November 7, 2020, the Trump campaign, the Republican National Committee, and the Arizona Republican Party filed a lawsuit against Secretary of State Katie Hobbs and Maricopa County Recorder Adrian Fontes that alleged that overvotes were "incorrectly rejected". Overvotes occur when a voter mark more than the options allowed in a given race, and stray markings can often be processed as overvotes by tabulation machines. The machines are programmed to alert voters of the overvote, allowing them to either request a new ballot or proceed with the original one. The lawsuit argued that those who chose to file their "original ballots are entitled to a manual inspection of their ballots later," and claimed that voters were urged to cast their original ballots by poll workers rather than request a new one. In total, 4,816 votes were deemed overvotes, which would be insufficient to overcome Biden's 10,457-vote advantage. A representative for Maricopa County stated that only "180 potential overvotes" were involved in the lawsuit, and that it would be "absurd" to assume all 180 were incorrectly counted. The Trump campaign requested that their evidence be kept secret from the public, but the judge refused to allow the secrecy. The Trump campaign also stated that they had video footage from within a polling area; however, such footage would be illegal if taken within 75 feet of a polling area with voters present. Thomas Liddy, a lawyer representing Maricopa County, deemed the lawsuit unnecessary, as if their claims were correct, both Biden and Trump votes would be equally affected, while Roopali Desai, an attorney representing the Secretary of State, argued the lawsuit attempted to "find a problem when one does not exist".

Mick West, a skeptical investigator and creator of the website Metabunk, cited how the percentage of votes deemed overvotes was lower or the same percentage as the last four elections, and a considerable decrease from 2016, when 21,785 overvotes (1.4%) were cast in the presidential election in Maricopa County.

On November 10, 2020, Associate Presiding Civil Judge Daniel Kiley accepted a request from Snell & Wilmer, the law firm which was representing the Trump campaign and its allies, to withdraw from the Arizona lawsuit. On November 11, 2020, Arizona Attorney General Mark Brnovich rejected Trump's voter fraud claim during an interview with Fox Business and stated that Biden would win the state of Arizona. On November 13, the Trump campaign dropped their lawsuit after it became evident that the number of votes potentially to be contested would not overcome Biden's margin of victory in the state.

Audit ordered by Arizona Senate Republicans

Origins
On March 31, 2021, the Arizona Senate Republican caucus hired four firms to examine the ballots in Maricopa County in the races for President and for the United States Senate, with a Florida-based company called Cyber Ninjas being the lead firm. Cyber Ninjas' owner, Doug Logan, is a Trump supporter and a proponent of Trump's false claims of voter fraud. The process involves an audit to search for evidence of fraud, and a hand recount of the 2.1 million ballots cast in Maricopa County. The hand recount is managed by Wake Technology Services, which reportedly had been hired for a previous audit in a rural Pennsylvania county by Trump attorney Sidney Powell, who has promoted numerous conspiracy theories about the election; the firm works primarily in the healthcare sector with little to no experience with elections.

The Arizona Republicans funded the effort by using $150,000 from the State Senate operating budget, but this money is acknowledged to be insufficient and the actual source of funding has not been declared. Patrick Byrne, the former CEO of Overstock.com and promoter of 2020 election conspiracy theories, donated one million dollars to the effort and created a website to raise further funds, which was promoted by former Trump national security advisor Michael Flynn. The fundraising was conducted through a 501(c)(4) organization, a tax code provision intended primarily for the promotion of social welfare. One America News personalities also created a dark money organization to raise funds, while providing extensive coverage of the audit that drew praise from Trump. CueCat inventor J. Hutton Pulitzer claims to have invented a system for detecting "kinematic markers" which is being used by Cyber Ninjas. Pulitzer is also said to be the originator of the claim that Chinese ballots with paper containing bamboo are part of the claimed fraud. Flynn and Byrne stated that, if they were proven wrong, the would publicly apologize that they "put this country through this."

Conduct and concerns
The audit began on April 22, and on the same day Arizona Senate Democrats filed a lawsuit to stop the audit. The next day Judge Christopher Coury agreed to suspend the audit for three days until the contractors can present documentation on how they will conduct the audit. The suspension was conditioned on the Arizona Senate Democrats posting a $1 million bond to cover the cost that the delay could cost the Arizona State Senate Republicans. But because the Arizona State Senate Democrats refused to post the bond, the suspension did not go into effect. By May 5 Arizona Senate Democrats reached a settlement with the Arizona Senate Republicans to allow independent elections experts to observe the audit. The agreement authorizes Secretary of State Katie Hobbs to file suit against Cyber Ninjas for breach of contract if the company does not live up to the agreement.

Former Arizona Secretary of State Ken Bennett, a Republican, had been designated as the State Senate's liaison to the audit. On May 5, 2021, Hobbs sent a letter to Bennett, detailing additional concerns with the way the audit was being conducted. Her letter cited the audit's disclosed procedures (departures from best practices for hand recounts) and the reports of the observers sent from the Secretary of State's office (including sloppy handling of ballots). A response from the audit's Twitter account asserted that Hobbs’s allegations were "baseless claimes [sic]". 

Also on May 5, the United States Department of Justice sent Karen Fann, president of the Arizona State Senate, a letter expressing concerns that the audit may violate federal laws. One concern is that the law requires election officials to maintain custody of all voting records for up to 22 months. Another concern is that the statement of work for Cyber Ninjas authorizes Cyber Ninjas to knock on voters' doors to ask them if they have voted in the 2020 elections, which may amount to voter intimidation and constitute a violation of the Voting Rights Act of 1965. After the Department of Justice threatened to sue over this plan, Cyber Ninjas agreed not to do it.

As part of the audit, auditors have been looking for secret watermarks, machine-markings, and bamboo fibers within the ballots. The testing for bamboo fibers was intended to prove a conspiracy theory that counterfeit ballots were shipped from South Korea after the elections. The audit was supposed to have concluded on May 14, but as of May 9, only 12% of the ballots were counted. The audit is being conducted at the main floor of the Arizona Veterans Memorial Coliseum, which was not available for this activity beyond the original target date. Consequently, the audit went on hiatus on May 14 and resumed on May 24.

The objectivity of the audit has been called into question due to the involvement of Logan. Additionally, Anthony Kern, a former Republican state lawmaker who was present at the 2021 storming of the United States Capitol, has been seen tallying votes. Kern, who was himself named on the ballots as a would-be Trump presidential elector as well as running for re-election to the Arizona House of Representatives, has since been removed from the group with access to the ballots. Former Arizona Secretary of State Ken Bennett, a Republican, is advising the audit. Hobbs, the current Secretary of State, has criticized Bennett's efforts, saying he needs to "either do it right, or don't do it at all."

The audit has produced division among Arizona Republicans. After initially supporting the audit, on May 9 Paul Boyer, a member of the Arizona State Senate Republican caucus, criticized the audit, saying "it makes us look like idiots." The Maricopa County Board of Supervisors, which is dominated by Republicans, also opposed the audit. On May 17, the board held a hearing and sent Fann a twelve-page letter to dispute her allegations of wrongdoing by county officials. Republican board chairman Jack Sellers stated that the allegations were actually due to the incompetence of the auditors and accused Fann of an "attempt at legitimatizing a grift disguised as an audit." Fann, however, continued to support the audit, and sent the Board of Supervisors a four-page letter stating that "serious issues" had arisen during the audit. Arizona Republican Party Chairwoman Kelli Ward released multiple videos about the audit, in which she criticized the Board of Supervisors and raised "the possibility of placing the validity of the entire 2020 election into question." A poll conducted at the end of March found that 78.3% of Arizona Republicans believed "that there was significant voter fraud in the 2020 United States Presidential Election which compromised the integrity of the election."

Fann made an allegation, later amplified by Trump in a May 15 post on his blog, asserting that Maricopa County election officials deleted the voting database after the election. Maricopa County Recorder Stephen Richer, a Republican who oversees elections, tweeted that Trump's post was "unhinged", noting he was looking at the database on his computer at that moment. Richer added, "We can’t indulge these insane lies any longer." The auditors later acknowledged the database had not been deleted. 

The Arizona Republic reported in May that because Senate Republicans had given private companies and individuals unfettered and unmonitored access to voting machines, the county might need to expend significant funds and time to ensure the equipment would meet federal, state and local requirements for certifying and protecting election equipment. The Republic reported the voting machines were worth $6 million. Hobbs, the Secretary of State, later informed the Board of Supervisors that election technology and security experts, including at the federal Cybersecurity and Infrastructure Security Agency, unanimously advised her that the machines should not be reused in future elections because no methods exist to adequately secure them.

A preliminary report on the results of the audit, made at the cost of some six million dollars raised from Trump supporters determined to overturn the election, found no evidence of fraud. Despite that, Trump continued to claim that there had been fraud in the tabulation of results and confirmation of the Biden win. The audit claimed to have found minor discrepancies in the original, state-certified count, that had actually widened Biden's margin by 360 votes.

See also
 2020 Arizona elections
 2020 United States presidential election
 2020 Democratic Party presidential primaries
 2020 Republican Party presidential primaries
 2020 United States elections

Notes
Partisan clients

Voter samples and additional candidates

References

Further reading
 
 
 . (describes bellwether Maricopa County, Arizona)

External links 
 
 
  (state affiliate of the U.S. League of Women Voters)

Arizona
2020
Presidential